Live at the Ram's Head is the third live album by the American rock band Little Feat, released in 2002 (see 2002 in music).

Track listing
Disc one
"Hate to Lose Your Lovin'" (Barrère, Fuller) – 4:35
"Rocket in My Pocket" (George) – 7:13
"Honest Man" (George, Tackett) – 6:49
"Oh Atlanta" (Payne) – 7:30
"Calling the Children Home" (Barrère, Payne, Tackett) – 8:46
"Rag Mama Rag" (J. R. Robertson) – 6:50
"Shake Me Up" (Barrère, Fuller, Kibbee, Payne) – 4:44
"Easy to Slip/I Know You Rider" (George, Kibbee, Traditional) – 8:01
"Bed of Roses" (Murphy, Payne) – 4:52
"One Clear Moment" (Barrère, Fuller, Payne) – 4:48
"Willin'" (George) – 6:15

Disc two
"Gringo" (Payne) – 8:35
"Cajun Rage" (Barrère, Kibbee, Wray) – 6:20
"Cadillac Hotel" (Payne, Wray) – 6:33
"Spanish Moon" (George) – 8:36
"Skin It Back" (Barrère) – 7:34
"Hoy Hoy" (Barrère, Murphy, Payne, Tackett) – 5:32
"Let It Roll" (Barrère, Payne, Kibbee) – 10:00
"On Your Way Down" (Toussaint) – 8:18
"Cajun Girl" (Payne, Kibbee) – 7:29
"Feats Don't Fail Me Now" (George, Barrère, Kibbee) – 5:04

Band members
Paul Barrère - guitar, vocals
Sam Clayton - percussion, vocals
Kenny Gradney - bass, vocals
Richard Hayward - drums, vocals
Shaun Murphy - vocals, percussion
Bill Payne - keyboards, vocals
Fred Tackett - guitar, mandolin, trumpet, vocals

Special guest
Ron Holloway - tenor saxophone on "Feats Don't Fail Me Now"

References

External links
Official site of the Rams Head

Albums produced by Bill Payne
Little Feat live albums
2002 live albums